Henry David Thoreau (1817–1862) was an American author, naturalist, transcendentalist, tax resister, development critic, and philosopher.

Thoreau may also refer to:
 Thoreau, New Mexico, United States
 Thoreau MacDonald (1901–1989), Canadian illustrator, designer and painter
 H. D. Thoreau, Jr. (1923–2007), track and field authority

See also
 44597 Thoreau, a minor planet
 Thoreau Society
 Mélissa Theuriau (born 1978), French journalist